Defending champion Natela Dzalamidze and her partner Viktória Kužmová defeated Anna-Lena Friedsam and Nadiia Kichenok in the final, 4–6, 7–5, [12–10] to win the doubles tennis title at the 2023 Linz Open.

Dzalamidze and Kamilla Rakhimova were the defending champions from 2021, when the event was last held, but chose to compete with different partners. Rakhimova partnered Yana Sizikova, but lost in the first round to Dzalamidze and Kužmová.

Seeds

Draw

Draw

References

External links 
 Main draw

Upper Austria Ladies Linz - Doubles
Upper Austria Ladies Linz Doubles